Checkpoint is a 1998 Russian drama film directed by Aleksandr Rogozhkin.

Plot 
The film takes place in 1996 in the North Caucasus, during the First Chechen War. In one mountain aul, a landmine exploded and kills a disabled child. Now the platoon that carried out the incident was sent to a checkpoint to rescue the soldiers from the revenge of the villagers.

Cast 
 Aleksandr Ivanov as Boeing
 Andrey Krasko as Iliych
 Aleksey Buldakov as General
 Zoya Buryak as Detective
 Sergei Guslinsky as Lieutenant Borya
 Roman Romantsov as Bones
 Kirill Ulyanov as Professor
 Ivan Kuzmin as Ash
 Denis Kirillov as Skag
 Egor Tomoshevskiy as Fingers

References

External links 
 

1998 films
1990s Russian-language films
Russian drama films
Russian television films
Films set in 1996
Films shot in the North Caucasus
Chechen wars films
Military of Russia in films
Films directed by Aleksandr Rogozhkin
1998 drama films